Wanchai Tabwises (born February 11, 1986) is a member of the Thailand men's national volleyball team.

Career 
Wanchai became Most Valuable Player in the 2012–13 Thailand League season.

Club 
  Nakhon Ratchasima (2005–present)

Awards

Individual 
 2012–13 Thailand League "Best Spiker"
 2012–13 Thailand League "Most Valuable Player"
 2014–15 Thailand League "Most Valuable Player"
 2014–15 Thailand League "Best Outside Spiker"
 2014–15 Thailand League "Most Valuable Player"
 2014–15 Thailand League "Best Outside Hitters"
 2017 Thai-Denmark Super League "Most Valuable Player"
 2017–18 Thailand League "Best Outside Spiker"

Club 
 2007–08 Thailand League -  Champion, with Nakhon Ratchasima
 2010–11 Thailand League -  Runner-Up, with Nakhon Ratchasima
 2012–13 Thailand League -  Champion, with Nakhon Ratchasima
 2013–14 Thailand League -  Champion, with Nakhon Ratchasima
 2014–15 Thailand League -  Champion, with Nakhon Ratchasima
 2014 Thai–Denmark Super League -  Runner-Up, with Nakhon Ratchasima
 2016 Thai–Denmark Super League -  Champion, with Nakhon Ratchasima
 2016–17 Thailand League -  Runner-up, with Nakhon Ratchasima
 2017 Thai–Denmark Super League -  Champion, with Nakhon Ratchasima
 2017–18 Thailand League -  Champion, with Nakhon Ratchasima
 2018 Thai–Denmark Super League -  Third, with Nakhon Ratchasima
 2019 Thai–Denmark Super League -  Champion, with Nakhon Ratchasima

References

1986 births
Living people
Wanchai Tabwises
Wanchai Tabwises
Volleyball players at the 2006 Asian Games
Volleyball players at the 2010 Asian Games
Wanchai Tabwises
Wanchai Tabwises
Wanchai Tabwises
Southeast Asian Games medalists in volleyball
Competitors at the 2007 Southeast Asian Games
Competitors at the 2009 Southeast Asian Games
Competitors at the 2011 Southeast Asian Games
Competitors at the 2013 Southeast Asian Games
Wanchai Tabwises
Wanchai Tabwises